These are the results for the 42nd edition of the Ronde van Nederland cycling race, which was held from August 20 to August 24, 2002. The race started in Utrecht and finished in Landgraaf.

Stages

20-08-2002: Utrecht-Leeuwarden, 220 km

21-08-2002: Dokkum-Apeldoorn, 176 km

22-08-2002: Apeldoorn-Almelo, 74 km

22-08-2002: Almelo-Almelo, 19 km

23-08-2002: Arnhem-Sittard/Geleen, 198 km

24-08-2002: Sittard/Geleen-Landgraaf, 205 km

Final classification

External links
 Wielersite Results]

Ronde van Nederland
2002 in road cycling
2002 in Dutch sport